Vanessa Seele (born 2 February 1998) is a German female badminton player.

Achievements

BWF International Challenge/Series

Women's Doubles

 BWF International Challenge tournament
 BWF International Series tournament
 BWF Future Series tournament

References

External links 

1998 births
Living people
German female badminton players